Wattie or Watty is a masculine given name or nickname, often a diminutive form of Walter, and a surname. It may refer to:

Given name or nickname
 Walter Aitkenhead (1887–1966), Scottish footballer
 Walter Watty Allan (1868–1943), Scottish footballer
 Walter Wattie Buchan (born 1957), Scottish punk rock lead vocalist and musician
 Derrick Watty Burnett (born 1950), Jamaican reggae vocalist and musician
 William Watson Watty Clark (1902–1972), American Major League Baseball pitcher
 Wattie Cooper, New Zealand footballer
 Wharton Wattie Davies (1873–1961), Welsh rugby union and rugby league footballer
 Peter Watt Wattie Dick (1927—2012), Scottish footballer
 Walter Wattie Dunphy (1896–1972), Irish hurler
 Walter Watty Friend (1898–c. 1983), Australian rugby union player
 Roscoe Wattie Holm (1901–1950), American Major League Baseball player
 Walter Wattie Jackson, Scottish footballer in the 1920s
 Walter Watty Keay (1871–1943), Scottish footballer
 Wyatt Watty Lee (1879–1936), American Major League Baseball outfielder and pitcher
 Watson Watty Moore (1925–1967), English footballer
 Walter Watty Shirlaw (born 1902), Scottish footballer
 George Walter Watty Wallace (1900–1964), Australian politician
 Bill Watkins (1858–1937), sometimes known as "Wattie" or "Watty", Canadian-born Major League Baseball player, manager, executive and team owner
 Craig Watson (triathlete) (born 1971), New Zealand triathlete
 Walter Wattie Wilson (1879–1926), Scottish footballer

Pen name
 Watty Piper, a pen name of Arnold Munk, author of the best-known version of the children's story The Little Engine That Could

Surname
 Harry Wattie (1893–1916), Scottish footballer
 James Wattie (1902–1974), New Zealand company manager, industrialist, philanthropist and race-horse owner, founder of Wattie's
 John Wattie, Episcopalian Dean of Aberdeen and Orkney from 1948 to 1953
Nora Wattie (1900–1994), Scottish public health medicine and ante-natal pioneer

In fiction 
 Bessie Watty and Mrs. Watty, characters in the play The Corn Is Green and its 1945 film adaptation

See also
 Watty, a nickname for the city of Watford, England
 Wattie's, an American-owned food processing company in the New Zealand market
 Goodman Fielder Wattie Book Awards, presented from 1968 to 1993
 Wat (given name), another short form of Walter
 George McWattie (1875–?), Scottish footballer

Masculine given names
Hypocorisms
Lists of people by nickname